David Rudolph Hiott (born October 20, 1960) is an American politician. He is a member of the South Carolina House of Representatives from the 4th District, serving since 2005, and the majority leader of the Republican party. He is a member of the Republican party.

Political career 
Hiott has served as Chairman of the Agriculture, Natural Resources and Environmental Affairs Committee. He remains a member of that Committee, and now also serves on the House Rules Committee.

Electoral history

2004 SC House of Representatives

2006 SC House of Representatives
Hiott was the only Republican to run in 2006, so there was no Republican primary.

2008 SC House of Representatives
Hiott was the only Republican to run in 2008, so there was no Republican primary.

2010 SC House of Representatives
Hiott was the only Republican to run in 2010, so there was no Republican primary.

2012 SC House of Representatives

2014 SC House of Representatives

2016 SC House of Representatives
Hiott was the only Republican to run in 2016, so there was no Republican primary.

2018 SC House of Representatives

Personal life
Hiott was born in Easley and currently resides in Pickens. He attended Central Wesleyan College, now Southern Wesleyan University, graduating in 1983 with a Bachelor of Arts degree in business. He is married to Lisa Clamp Hiott, with whom he has two children: Lander and Sally.

References

1960 births
21st-century American politicians
Living people
Republican Party members of the South Carolina House of Representatives
Southern Wesleyan University alumni